Basil Malan (October 1911 – 20 June 1967) was a South African cricket umpire. He stood in six Test matches between 1950 and 1957.

See also
 List of Test cricket umpires

References

1911 births
1967 deaths
People from Pretoria
South African Test cricket umpires